The Tonopah Volunteer Firehouse and Gymnasium is a historic fire station located at the intersection of Brougher and Burro Streets in Tonopah, Nevada. Built in 1907, the firehouse housed Tonopah's volunteer fire department. The firehouse was built by Tonopah's newly appointed fire chief to address inadequacies in the town's fire protection services, which had failed to stop a major fire in 1904. A gymnasium for the firefighters was constructed next to the fire station in 1908. Tonopah still suffered three major fires after its fire station was built, including a 1920 fire which damaged the station itself; the building was subsequently restored to its original condition.

The firehouse was added to the National Register of Historic Places on May 20, 1982.

The Water Company of Tonopah Building is adjacent.

References

Tonopah, Nevada
Buildings and structures in Nye County, Nevada
Fire stations completed in 1907
Government buildings completed in 1907
Fire stations on the National Register of Historic Places in Nevada
Government buildings on the National Register of Historic Places in Nevada
National Register of Historic Places in Tonopah, Nevada
1907 establishments in Nevada